The second round of the 2000–01 UEFA Cup began on 23 October 2000. The round included 48 winners from the first round.

Seeding

Matches

|}

1 This 2nd leg match in Vigo actually ended with the score 5–3 for the hosts Celta, but was later officially recorded as 3–0 walkover since it was discovered that Red Star fielded two suspended players.

First leg

Second leg

Kaiserslautern win 5-4 on aggregate

Osijek win 4-1 on aggregate

PAOK win 3–1 on aggregate

Werder Bremen win 9–3 on aggregate

1860 München win 5–4 on aggregate

AEK Athens win 6–2 on aggregate

Hertha BSC win 4–2 on aggregate

Alavés win 5–3 on aggregate

1–1 on aggregate. Internazionale win on away goals

Bordeaux win 3–2 on aggregate

Espanyol win 4–1 on aggregate

Roma win 2–1 on aggregate

Stuttgart win 3–2 on aggregate

Celta were awarded a 3–0 victory for the second leg as Red Star fielded ineligible players, therefore winning 3–1 on aggregate

Lokomotiv Moscow win 3–1 on aggregate

Feyenoord win 3–1 on aggregate

Liverpool win 4–2 on aggregate

2–2 on aggregate Rayo Vallecano win on away goals

Lausanne win 3–2 on aggregate

Nantes win 3–1 on aggregate

Club Brugge win 3–2 on aggregate

Parma win 2–1 on aggregate

Slavia Prague win 6–3 on aggregate

Porto win 3–0 on aggregate

References

External links
Second Round Information
RSSSF Page
Worldfootball.net Page

2000–01 UEFA Cup